Saint Peter Port North was an electoral district in Guernsey in the Channel Islands. It was created following the Machinery of Government changes which came into effect in 2004.

It consists of the northern part of the parish of St. Peter Port. It is divided from St. Peter Port South by the following roads: Rohais, Les Gravées, The Grange and St. Julian's Avenue.

Polling stations:
 Beau Sejour Leisure Centre, Amherst 
 Princess Royal Performing Arts Centre, Les Ozouets

The district had six Deputies which represent its electorate in the States of Guernsey. In 2016 in line with the general reduction in the number of Deputies, it was reduced from seven to six.

Members

Election results

Elections in the 2010s

Elections in the 2000s

See also
 Elections in Guernsey

References

External links
 St Peter Port Deputies 1947 to 2004
 St Peter Port North Deputies from 2004

2004 establishments in Guernsey
2020 disestablishments in Guernsey
Constituencies established in 2004
Constituencies disestablished in 2020
Former electoral districts of Guernsey